The Woodlands School is a public elementary and secondary school in Mississauga, Ontario, under the Peel District School Board. It has a diverse student population, with large numbers of students of South and East Asian backgrounds. The school has an English as a Second Language (ESL) program to assist new immigrants, and a Peer Assisted Learning (PALS) program. The school is also a Regional Enhanced Learning Centre for the secondary program.

History 

The Woodlands School was opened in the year 1969. While the first phase of its present building was under construction, classes operated within Springfield Public School building. In September 1970, the students and staff moved to the new building, and The Woodlands became a combined elementary and secondary school. 

The facility received a major renovation throughout 2016. This renovation implemented a new open concept design to the front of the school, and also removed the old library building attached to the school, replacing it with a new elementary classroom wing. An elevator was later built near the front of the school.

Academics

Elementary students 

Secondary students 
Courses are offered at the Enhanced, Academic, Applied, and Locally Developed levels. The Woodlands also offers a gifted education program. Students currently residing in Mississauga who are identified as gifted through the Canadian Cognitive Abilities Test are given the option of attending Woodlands, with transportation provided by the Peel District School Board. Enhanced courses teach the same material as Academic courses, but the manner of teaching and style of evaluation vary based on the needs of the students.

There is also a Developmentally Delayed Program within the school, where small numbers of students receive intensive support from classroom teachers and educational assistants. 

The Woodlands School consistently places among the top academic schools in the Peel District School Board and in Ontario. Students excel in extracurriculars like Debate, Chess, and DECA, and there is a strong music program, with students placing at national & international festivals. 
In addition, the school has a high Ontario Secondary School Literacy Test pass rate, averaging over 95% since its inception.

Athletic
The Woodlands Rams compete within the Region of Peel Secondary School Athletic Association (ROPSSAA). ROPSSAA is made up of over 60 schools from across the Peel Board of Education and the Dufferin Peel Catholic School Board. Below are some of the leagues and championships that ROPSSAA organizes:
 Archery (boys, girls – spring)
 Badminton (boys, girls – early spring) 
 Baseball (boys – spring)
 Basketball (girls – fall / boys – winter) 
 Bocce ball (boys, girls – fall)
 Cricket (boys – early spring)
 * Cross Country Running (boys, girls – fall) 
 * Field Hockey (girls – fall 
 Field Lacrosse (boys – spring) 
 Flag Football (girls – fall) 
 * Football (boys – fall, program cancelled as of 2015 season 
 Golf (boys, girls – fall) 
 * Rugby (boys, girls – spring)
 * Slopitch Softball (girls – spring)
 * Soccer (boys, girls – spring) 
 * Tennis (boys, girls – fall) 
 * Track and Field (boys, girls – spring)
 * Ultimate Frisbee (boys, girls – spring)
 * Volleyball (boys – fall / girls – winter)

Notable alumni

Angela Bailey - Canadian Olympic track and field athlete
Darcy Brown - CFL player
Darwyn Cooke - Comic book writer and artist
Kyle Jones - Plays for the Toronto Argonauts of the Canadian Football League
Dontae Richards-Kwok - Canadian sprinter
Cam Stewart - Media/radio personality for The Score
Sven Spengemann - MP for Mississauga-Lakeshore
Kat Teasdale - professional auto racing driver

See also
List of high schools in Ontario

References

External links
The Woodlands school website 
Woodlands School Council website
The Woodlands School Enhanced Learning Program website

Peel District School Board
Educational institutions established in 1969
Gifted education
High schools in Mississauga
Middle schools in Mississauga
1969 establishments in Ontario